National Council of Swedish Women (Swedish: "Svenska Kvinnors Nationalförbund") is the Swedish branch of the International Council of Women.

It was founded in 1896 by Ellen Fries to function as an umbrella organisation for women's organisations in Sweden and represent Sweden at the international congresses of the ICW.

Chairperson 
 1896-1898: Ellen Anckarsvärd
 1898-1909: Anna Hierta-Retzius
 1909-1920: Eva Upmark
 1920-1927: Bertha Nordenson
 1927-1928: Malin Wester-Hallberg
 1929: Elisif Theel

References
 NE
 Dagny, nr 36, 1911
 Dagny, nr 2, 1928
 Dagny, nr 36, 1911
 Hertha, nr 5, 1922
 Historisk Tidskrift, 2007

1896 in Sweden
Feminist organizations in Sweden
1896 establishments in Sweden
1896 in women's history